Juan Peña may refer to:

Juan Peña (baseball) (born 1977), Dominican major league baseball player
Juan Manuel Peña (born 1973), Bolivian soccer player
Juan Peña (weightlifter) (born 1992), Dominican Republic weightlifter
Juan Felipe Peña, designer of the Peña Adobe